Volodimir Levin (born 23 January 1984) is an Azerbaijani professional footballer, who last played as a defender for Gabala and the Azerbaijan national team. He also holds Ukrainian citizenship.

In the summer of 2013 Levin signed with Gabala, having previously spent 9 seasons at Inter Baku after signing from Chornomorets-2 Odessa.

Career statistics

Club

International

Honors
Inter Baku
Azerbaijan Premier League (2): 2007–08, 2009–10

References

External links

 Profile on Inter Baku's Official Site
 
 

1984 births
Living people
Ukrainian footballers
Azerbaijani expatriate footballers
Expatriate footballers in Ukraine
Azerbaijani expatriate sportspeople in Ukraine
Azerbaijani footballers
Azerbaijan international footballers
Azerbaijani people of Russian descent
FC Chornomorets Odesa players
FC Chornomorets-2 Odesa players
Shamakhi FK players
Gabala FC players
Ukrainian Second League players
Sportspeople from Arkhangelsk
Association football defenders